Alen Jurilj (born 7 March 1996) is a professional footballer who plays as a left winger for Premier League of Bosnia and Herzegovina club Borac Banja Luka. Born in Croatia, he represented Bosnia and Herzegovina internationally.

Honours
Dinamo Zagreb
1. HNL: 2017–18
Croatian Cup: 2017–18

References

External links

1996 births
Living people
Footballers from Zagreb
Association football wingers
Bosnia and Herzegovina footballers
Bosnia and Herzegovina youth international footballers
NK Zagreb players
GNK Dinamo Zagreb players
GNK Dinamo Zagreb II players
NK Kustošija players
NK Široki Brijeg players
NK Domžale players
FK Borac Banja Luka players
Croatian Football League players
First Football League (Croatia) players
Premier League of Bosnia and Herzegovina players
Slovenian PrvaLiga players
Bosnia and Herzegovina expatriate footballers
Expatriate footballers in Croatia
Bosnia and Herzegovina expatriate sportspeople in Croatia
Expatriate footballers in Slovenia
Bosnia and Herzegovina expatriate sportspeople in Slovenia